is a 2016 Japanese comedy film directed by Nobuo Mizuta. A remake of the 2014 South Korean film Miss Granny, it stars Mikako Tabe and Mitsuko Baisho.

Plot

Cast 
 Mikako Tabe as Setsuko Otori
 Mitsuko Baisho as Katsu Setayama
 Satomi Kobayashi as Yukie Seyama
 Jun Kaname as Takuto Kobayashi
 Takumi Kitamura as Tsubasa Seyama
 Yoichi Nukumizu as photo studio owner
 Kotaro Shiga as Jiro Nakata

References

External links 
 

2016 films
2010s Japanese-language films
Japanese remakes of South Korean films
Japanese comedy films
2016 comedy films
2010s Japanese films